The following articles list the historic places in the province of British Columbia, Canada, entered on the Canadian Register of Historic Places, whether they are federal, provincial, or municipal. They are divided by regional districts.

 British Columbia Coast
 Alberni-Clayoquot
 British Columbia Coast
 Capital Region (excluding Victoria)
 Comox Valley
 Cowichan Valley
 Nanaimo
 Strathcona (excluding mainland)
 Victoria
 British Columbia Interior
 Central Kootenay
 Central Okanagan
 Columbia-Shuswap
 East Kootenay
 Kootenay Boundary
 North Okanagan
 Northern and Central British Columbia Interior
 Okanagan-Similkameen
 Thompson-Nicola
 Squamish-Lillooet
 Lower Mainland
 Fraser Valley
 Greater Vancouver
 Vancouver
 New Westminster
 North Shore
 Surrey

See also 
 
 List of National Historic Sites of Canada in British Columbia